Lac de Chailloux is a small lake at Contrevoz in the Ain department, France.

Chailloux